Sergei Sergeyevich Kramarenko (born 2 November 1994) is a Russian football midfielder. He plays for FC Dynamo Vladivostok.

Club career
He made his debut in the Russian Second Division for FC SKA Rostov-on-Don on 16 July 2012 in a game against FC Alania-d Vladikavkaz.

He made his Russian Football National League debut for PFC Spartak Nalchik on 11 July 2016 in a game against FC Kuban Krasnodar.

References

External links
 

1994 births
Sportspeople from Rostov-on-Don
Living people
Russian people of Ukrainian descent
Russian footballers
Association football midfielders
FC SKA Rostov-on-Don players
PFC Spartak Nalchik players
FC Shinnik Yaroslavl players
FC Chayka Peschanokopskoye players
Russian First League players
Russian Second League players